Anders Melin (31 July 1921 – 5 June 2001) was a Swedish long-distance runner. He competed in the marathon at the 1948 Summer Olympics.

References

External links
 

1921 births
2001 deaths
Athletes (track and field) at the 1948 Summer Olympics
Swedish male long-distance runners
Swedish male marathon runners
Olympic athletes of Sweden
People from Sundsvall
Sportspeople from Västernorrland County